Bieriņi is a neighbourhood of Riga, the capital of Latvia.

See also

References

Neighbourhoods in Riga